= Museum of History of Communication Development (Rostov-on-Don) =

Fortress and museum in Rostov-on-Don, Rostov, Russia

Coordinates: 47°13′29″N 39°42′24″E

- Музей истории развития связи на Дону (Russian)
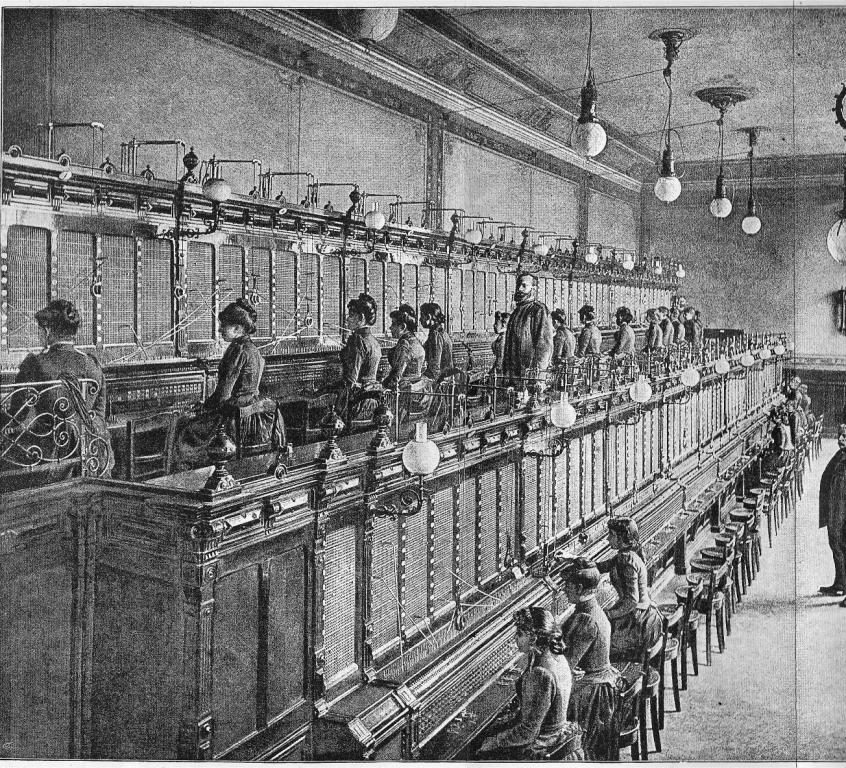
- Historic telephone exchange with two rows of service desks

- Location within Russia
- Type: Fortress and Museum
- Location: Rostov-on-Don, Rostov oblast Russia

History
- Built: 2009

The Museum of History of Communication Development on the River Don – a specialized museum dedicated to the history of the emergence and development of communication in the Rostov Region.

== History ==
The museum of the history of communication development on the Don was opened on May 6, 2009 in the Rostov branch of "Southern Telecommunications Company".

The museum presents a variety of telephone equipment, which was used by the signalmen for 120 years. The first phones without dialing, the communication facilities of the First and Second World War, radio stations, etc. are presented. Among the exhibits there is an American field telephone of 1942, which was presented to the museum for the 60th anniversary of the Victory.

In the museum you can get acquainted with the history of communication development in the Rostov region, which dates back to April 1885. At this time, the City Duma decided to provide the city with telephone communication. The launch of the communication station took place on August 20, 1886. The capacity of the first station was 60 numbers, by 1913 the number of subscribers was 3304. Switching of subscribers was carried out by telephone operators. The telephone network was operated by K. Siegel.

== Description ==
In total, the museum has about 500 exhibits. In the first years of the development of communication, only tall girls could work phone callers. High girls with long arms could reach the telephone connectors manually using wires.
